Lugang or Lukang may refer to:

 Lugang, Shantou (胪岗镇), a town in Chaonan District, Shantou, Guangdong, People's Republic of China
 Lugang station (芦港站), a railway station in Ningbo City, Zhejiang Province, People's Republic of China
 Lukang, Changhua (鹿港鎮), an urban township of Changhua County, Taiwan, Republic of China
 Lukang Ai Gate (鹿港隘門)
 Lukang Artist Village (鹿港藝術村)
 Lukang Culture Center (鹿港公會堂)
 Lukang Folk Arts Museum (鹿港民俗文物館)
 Lukang Kinmen Hall (鹿港金門館)
 Lukang Longshan Temple (鹿港龍山寺)
 Lukang Rimao Hang (鹿港日茂行)
 Lukang Tianhou Temple (鹿港天后宮)
 Lukang Wen Wu Temple (鹿港文武廟)

See also
 Lu Gang (born 1970), Chinese weightlifter
 Lu Guang (disambiguation), several people